Jared Michael Jeffrey (born June 14, 1990) is an American former professional soccer player.

Career

Youth
Jeffrey was born in Dallas, Texas. After winning the Parade Boys Soccer National High School Player of the Year in 2008, Jeffrey signed with Club Brugge KV of Belgium.

Senior
After the 2009 U-20 Men's World Cup, Jeffrey was sold to FSV. Mainz 05 of the Bundesliga under Thomas Tuchel in the winter transfer period in 2010. He played there for 3 and a half seasons, mostly appearing for the reserve side.

D.C. United
On July 3, 2013 it was announced that Jeffrey had been picked up by Major League Soccer side D.C. United in a waiver draft. He debuted for D.C. United on July 27 against the New England Revolution in which he started and played 79 minutes as D.C. United lost the match 1–2. On August 3, Jeffrey scored his first goal with his new club, netting a pass from Conor Doyle to give United a 3–1 lead against Montreal Impact. United would go on to win by the same scoreline.

Jeffrey retired at the end of their 2018 season.

International
Jeffrey had represented the United States at the under-17, under-20, and the under-23 levels.  Jeffrey spent five semesters in the U-17 men's national team residency program, where he led all players with 39 caps. Jeffrey played for the U.S. U-17 men's national team in 2007 U-17 FIFA World Cup, making four starts as the US reached the Round of 16. The midfielder tallied once with a late penalty against Tunisia in the group stages. He captained the under-17 side during the 2007 FIFA U-17 World Cup and had played for the u20 side during the 2009 FIFA U-20 World Cup. He also was a member of the 2012 U-23 Men's team that failed to qualify for the Olympics.

Career statistics

Honors

D.C. United
Lamar Hunt U.S. Open Cup (1): 2013

References

External links 
 
 U.S. Soccer bio

1990 births
Living people
American soccer players
American expatriate soccer players
1. FSV Mainz 05 players
1. FSV Mainz 05 II players
D.C. United players
Richmond Kickers players
Association football midfielders
Soccer players from Dallas
Expatriate footballers in Belgium
Expatriate footballers in Germany
Major League Soccer players
USL Championship players
United States men's youth international soccer players
United States men's under-20 international soccer players
United States men's under-23 international soccer players
2009 CONCACAF U-20 Championship players